Olav Larsson Os (5 January 1882 – 19 March 1953) was a Norwegian politician for the Agrarian Party.

He hailed from Nordfjordeid, and made a career in silver fox breeding.  He chaired the Norwegian Silver Fox Breeders' Association (now: the Norwegian Fur Breeders' Association) and several other organizations in his field. He was a board member of Nordfjord Hospital and served as mayor of Eid from 1935 to 1952 and in 1947.

He was elected as a deputy representative to the Parliament of Norway in 1927, 1930, 1933, 1936 and 1945. During the first term, 1928–1930, he moved up as a regular representative following the death of Anfin Øen.

References

1882 births
1953 deaths
People from Eid, Norway
Norwegian farmers
Centre Party (Norway) politicians
Sogn og Fjordane politicians
Members of the Storting